Gadgetman is a 1996 American-British TV movie directed by Jim Goddard starring Martin Delaney and Marina Sirtis.

Plot
When an inventor is captured by kidnappers attempting to access ATMs, his son and his son's friends use computers to rescue him.

Cast
 Marina Sirtis as Detective Inspector Walker
 Martin Delaney as Bean McNeil
 James Weir as Sumo
 James Young as Chip
 Patrick Delaney as Young Bean

External links

1996 television films
1996 films
American television films
British television films
Films directed by Jim Goddard
Films shot in Scotland
Films shot in the United Kingdom
Films set in the United Kingdom